Moll is a surname. Notable people with the surname include:

 Albert Moll (German psychiatrist), (1862–1939), founder of modern sexology
 Albert Moll (Canadian psychiatrist), pioneer in day treatment for psychiatric patients
 Brian Moll (1925–2013), British-born Australian actor
 Carl Moll (1861–1945), Austrian painter
 Claudia Moll (born 1968), German politician
 Eva Moll (born 1975), German visual artist
 Friedrich Rudolf Heinrich Carl Moll (1882–1951), German wood-preservation specialist
 Gerrit Moll (1785–1838), Dutch scientist and mathematician
 Giorgia Moll (born 1938), Italian retired film actress
 Guy Moll (1910–1934), French auto racer
 Herman Moll (1654?–1732), British cartographer
 Herman Moll (convict), Australian historical figure
 Jacob Anton Moll, Dutch oculist and namesake for the gland of Moll
 John Selwyn Moll  (1913-1942), English banker and rugby union player 
 Joseph Moll (1813–1849), German labour leader and revolutionary, an early associate of Karl Marx
 Jürgen Moll, German footballer
 Kurt Moll (1938–2017), German operatic bass singer
 Louis-Joseph Moll, physician and MLA for Quebec
 Oskar Moll (1875–1947), German painter, husband of Marg Moll
 Otto Moll (1915–1946), German SS-Hauptscharführer at Auschwitz Concentration Camp executed for war crimes
 Marg Moll (1884–1977), German sculptor, painter and author, wife of Oskar Moll
 Richard Moll (born 1943), American actor
 Sam Moll (born 1992), American baseball player
 Toby Moll (1890–1916), South African rugby union player
 Toby Moll (general) (1917–1967), South African major-general and Chief of Defence Staff
 Tony Moll, American football player
 Victor Hugo Moll (born 1956), American mathematician
 William Edmund Moll (1856–1932), English Anglican priest and christian socialist

See also
 King Æthelwald Moll of Northumbria